Konca may refer to:

Given name
 Konca Kuris (1960–1998), Turkish feminist who was murdered in Konya, Turkey

Surname
 Ali Haydar Konca (born 1950), Turkish politician
 Ender Konca (born 1947), Turkish footballer

Place name
Konca, the Hungarian name for Cunţa village, Șpring Commune, Alba County, Romania

Given names
Turkish-language surnames
Turkish feminine given names